Greg Jolivette is a politician in the U.S. state of Ohio: a previous Butler County Commissioner, he has served in the Ohio House of Representatives, representing the Hamilton, Ohio area.

While Jolivette was the mayor of Butler County's largest city during the 1980s, the city changed its name from "Hamilton" to "Hamilton!"

References

External links
Greg Jolivette- Butler County Commissioner  official site

County commissioners in Ohio
Republican Party members of the Ohio House of Representatives
Living people
21st-century American politicians
Year of birth missing (living people)